Wiley House may refer to:

(by state then town)
Emily Wiley House, a historic house in Washington, D.C.
Orton H. Wiley House, a historic house in Nampa, Idaho, listed on the NRHP in Canyon County
Tobe Wiley House, Paintsville, Kentucky, listed on the NRHP in Johnson County
James Sullivan Wiley House, a historic house in Dover-Foxcroft, Maine
Benjamin Wiley House, a historic house in North Fryeburg, Maine
Wiley-Ringland House, a historic house in Chevy Chase, Maryland
Caleb Wiley House, a historic house in Stoneham, Massachusetts
Mason-Lloyd-Wiley House, a historic house in Chapel Hill, North Carolina, home of Thomas F. Lloyd
KidsPeace, a Pennsylvania-based children's charity, formerly known as Wiley House
Wiley-Cloud House, a historic house in Kennett Township, Pennsylvania, listed on the NRHP in Chester County
Thomas W. Wiley House, a historic house in McKinney, Texas, listed on the NRHP in Collin County

See also
Wylie House, a historic house in Bloomington, Indiana